Gandhara was an ancient region in the north-west of Pakistan and parts of north-east  Afghanistan with its core at Peshawer basin and Swat Valley but influence going far up to Kabul and the Pothohar Plateau. This region played an important role in the history of South Asia and East Asia. Following is the list of important Gandharans from modern day's Gandhara region in chronological order;

Ancient era Gandharans 
Important Gandharans who influenced Ancient India include;
 Pāṇini (5th century BC), born in Śalatura he was a Sanskrit philologist, grammarian, and a revered scholar from Gandhara. Pāṇini is known for his text Aṣṭādhyāyī, a sutra-style treatise on Sanskrit grammar.

 Chanakya (4th century BC), born in Takshashila he was an ancient Gandharan teacher, philosopher, economist, jurist and royal advisor. Chanakya assisted the first Mauryan emperor Chandragupta in his rise to power, and his work Arthashastra is considered Pioneer of field of political science in India.

Founders of various Buddhist schools 

Gandharan Buddhist monks directly or indirectly developed important schools and traditions of Buddhism like Nyingma school of Tibet, Sautrāntika school of China, Hossō, Jōjitsu and Kusha-shū schools of Japan, as well as traditions of Dzogchen and Yogachara in East Asia. Gandharans were instrumental in spreading Buddhism to China, Korea and Japan and thus deeply influenced East Asian philosophy, history, and culture. Founders of various buddhist schools and traditions from Gandhara are as follows; ]]]
 Garab Dorje (1st century), born in Uddiyana (Swat) he was the founder of Dzogchen (Great Perfection) tradition of Tibetan Buddhism. 
 Kumāralāta (3rd century), born in Takshashila (Taxila) Kumāralāta was the founder of Sautrāntika school of Buddhism, one of original Buddhist schools. He was author of a "collection of dṛṣtānta" (Dṛṣtāntapaṅkti) called the Kalpanāmaṇḍitīkā. Sautrāntika school's teaching latter influenced formation of Jōjitsu school of Japanese Buddhism.
. 
 Vasubandhu (4th century), Born in Puruṣapura (Peshawer) Vasubandhu is considered one of the most influential thinkers in the Gandharan Buddhist philosophical tradition. In Jōdo Shinshū (most widely adhered branch of Japanese Buddhism), he is considered the Second Patriarch; in Chan Buddhism, he is the 21st Patriarch. His Abhidharmakośakārikā ("Commentary on the Treasury of the Abhidharma") is widely used in Tibetan and East Asian Buddhism.
 Asaṅga (4th century), Born in Puruṣapura (Peshawer)  he was "one of the most important spiritual figures" of Mahayana Buddhism and the "founder of the Yogachara tradition of East Asia ". His writing includes Mahāyānasaṃgraha (Summary of the Great Vehicle) and Abhidharma-samuccaya.
 Padmasambhāva (8th century), born in Uddiyana (Swat) he is considered the Second Buddha by the Nyingma school, which is the oldest Buddhist school in Tibet.

Translators 
Important Gandharans who played a significant role in translation of buddhist texts from Sanskrit into Chinese are as below;
 Zhi Yao (2nd century), he translated important Buddhist texts into Chinese during era of Han dynasty of China.
 Lokakṣema (2nd century), he translated important Sanskrit sutras into Chinese, during the rule of Han dynasty of China.
 Jñānagupta (6th century), translated 39 scriptures in 192 fascicles during the period 561 to 592 into Chinese during the rule of Sui dynasty of China.
 Prajñā (9th century), translated important Sanskrit sutras into Chinese during the rule of Tang dynasty of China.
 Dānapāla (11th century), he was a Buddhist monk and prolific translator of Sanskrit Buddhist sutras during the Song dynasty in China

Rulers
During ancient era (500 BC-500 AD) many rulers ruled kingdom of Gandhara independently.  Main Gandharan rulers of this era include:
Porus the Elder (4th century BC), ruler of Eastern Gandhara
Ambhi (4th century BC), ruler of Taxila

Peithon (son of Agenor) (4th century BC), Greek ruler of Gandhara 
Pantaleon (2nd century BC), first Indo Greek ruler of Gandhara 
Menander I (2nd century BC), first Buddhist Indo-Greek ruler of Gandhara

Archebius (1st century BC), last Indo-Greek ruler of Gandhara 
Maues (1st century BC), first Indo-Scythian ruler of Gandhara 
Kharahostes (1st century BC), last Indo-Scythian ruler of Gandhara 
Gondophares (1st century AD), first Indo-Parthian ruler of Gandhara 
Pacores (1st century AD), last Indo-Parthian ruler of Gandhara 
Vima Takto (1st century AD), first Kushan ruler of Gandhara
Kanishka (2nd century AD), first Buddhist Kushan ruler of Gandhara 

Kipunada (4th century AD), last Kushan ruler of Gandhara 
Kidara I (4th century AD), first Kidarite ruler of Gandhara 

Kandik (5th century AD), last Kidarite ruler of Gandhara

Others
 Marananta (4th century), he brought Buddhism to Korean Peninsula.

See also
Aṣṭādhyāyī, text by Pāṇini
Arthashastra, text by Chanakya
Dzogchen tradition, founded by Garab Dorje
Maurya empire
Kushan empire

References 

Gandhara